The NCAA Rifle Championship is an annual co-educational rifle national collegiate championship sponsored by the National Collegiate Athletic Association (NCAA).  The tournament includes an individual and team championships consisting of the two-day aggregate scoring of the smallbore competition and air rifle competition. The national championship rounds are contested annually in mid-March.  West Virginia (19) and Alaska (10) have combined to win 29 of the 42 team championships. Unlike many NCAA sports, only one National Collegiate championship is held each season with teams from Division I, Division II, and Division III competing together.

Under NCAA rules, sports teams that include both men and women are designated as men's teams for purposes of sports sponsorship and scholarship limitations. Nonetheless, rifle has been a coed sport since 1980, a year before the NCAA began holding championships in women's sports. Schools sponsoring rifle may field anywhere from one to three teams. If a school chooses to sponsor more than one team, it may have any combination of men's, women's, and coed teams. Two schools field men's and women's teams, and three field women's and coed teams.

The current team national champions are the Kentucky Wildcats, who won their fourth national championship at Clune Arena, located within the Cadet Field House on the grounds of the United States Air Force Academy near Colorado Springs, Colorado, on March 11 and 12, 2022. Kentucky's Will Shaner won the 2022 individual title in small-bore. Air Force freshman Scott Rockett won the air rifle national championship, the first ever for the Academy.

Programs

Conferences
Great America Rifle Conference
Mid-Atlantic Rifle Conference
Ohio Valley Conference, the only Division I all-sports conference that sponsored rifle before the SoCon added it in 2016–17.
Patriot Rifle Conference
Southern Conference; resumed the sport in 2016–17 after a 30-year hiatus.

Champions
Prior to NCAA sponsorship in 1980, a collegiate rifle championship was held yearly by the National Rifle Association.
From 1980 to 2004, the championship consisted of 120 shots by each competitor in smallbore, and 40 shots per competitor in air rifle. Since 2005, the championship has consisted of 60 shots for both smallbore and air rifle, equaling a total of 120 shots per team member.

Team titles

Appearances by Team

Individual titles 
Schools in italics no longer compete in NCAA rifle.

See also
Pre-NCAA Intercollegiate Rifle Champions (1905-1979)
Pre-NCAA Women's Intercollegiate Rifle Champions

Footnotes

External links

NCAA Sports: Men's & Women's Rifle